The 1977–78 Serie A season was the 44th season of the Serie A, the top level of ice hockey in Italy. Nine teams participated in the league, and HC Bolzano won the championship.

Regular season

External links
 Season on hockeytime.net

1977–78 in Italian ice hockey
Serie A (ice hockey) seasons
Italy